SAR or Sar may refer to:

Places 
 Sar (river), Galicia, Spain
 Sar, Bahrain, a residential district
 Sar, Iran (disambiguation), several places in Iran
 Sar, Tibet, Tibet Autonomous Region of China
 Šar Mountains, in southeastern Europe
 Syrian Arab Republic, sometimes abbreviated as SAR
 SAR, Special Administrative Region of China

Business and finance 
 Parabolic SAR (stop and reverse), a method of technical stock analysis
 Saudi riyal, currency code SAR
 Stock appreciation right, an employee reward

Computing 
 Segmentation and reassembly, in data networks
 Service Archive or SAR, a file format related to JAR
 Shift Arithmetically Right (SAR), an x86 instruction
 Storage Aspect Ratio of a digital image
 sar (Unix), or system activity report, a Unix/Linux performance report utility

Law enforcement 
 Search and rescue
 Nationwide Suspicious Activity Reporting Initiative, US
 Suspicious activity report, by a financial institution to an authority

Science

Medicine, psychology, and biology 
 Scaffold/matrix attachment region or scaffold-attachment region, DNA sequences
 Sexual Attitude Reassessment
 Specific absorption rate, of RF energy by the human body
 SAR supergroup, a clade within eukaryotes
 Structure–activity relationship, of biological effect of a molecule
 Systemic acquired resistance, of a plant to a pathogen

Science and technology 
 Sar (astronomy), 9 years 5 days, a period separating eclipses
 SAR 21, Singapore Assault Rifle 21st century
 SAR-87 (Sterling SAR-87), 1980s military assault rifle
 Sodium adsorption ratio, an irrigation water quality parameter
 Spent Acid Regeneration of sulfuric acid
 Submarine Advanced Reactor program of USS Triton
 Successive Approximation Register of a successive-approximation ADC
 Synthetic-aperture radar, imaging radar
 IPCC Second Assessment Report
 Semi-automatic rifle

Organizations 
 SAR Academy, yeshiva in Riverdale, New York, US
 SAR High School, the high school of SAR Academy
 SAR Records, an American record label
 Scholars at Risk, a network supporting academic freedom
 School for Advanced Research in anthropology and related fields, Santa Fe, New Mexico, US
 Sigma Alpha Rho, a high school fraternity, Philadelphia, Pennsylvania, US
 Society for Artistic Research
 Sons of the American Revolution, US organisation

Railways 
 Saudi Arabia Railways, national railway company of Saudi Arabia
 Savage Alberta Railway, Alberta, Canada, reporting mark
 South Australian Railways, 1854–1978
 South African Railways, now part of Transnet Freight Rail

Military 
 Sandfontein Artillery Regiment, an artillery regiment of the South African Army
 State Artillery Regiment, an artillery regiment of the South African Army

Other uses 
 Sar (surname)
 Sar language, a Bongo–Bagirmi language of southern Chad
 Sample of Anonymised Records, based on the UK population census
 Search and rescue
 Special administrative region, territorial entity designation
 Student Aid Report, sent to applicants of U.S. federal financial aid for college
 Subject access request, in data protection law
 Super Animal Royale, a 2021 video game developed by Pixile Studios

See also 
 Saar (disambiguation)
 SARS (disambiguation)